Ekebyhov Castle (Ekebyhovs slott) is a former manor in Ekerö  Municipality in Stockholm County, Sweden. The facility has been owned by Ekerö municipality since 1980 and has been the site of  Ekebyhovs Äppelgenbank  since 1998.

Much of SVT's Christmas calendar Mirakel (2020) was shot at Ekebyhov Castle.

See also
List of castles in Sweden

References

Manor houses in Sweden
Buildings and structures in Stockholm County